Gerard and Marcel Granollers were the defending champions but chose not to defend their title.

Max Purcell and Luke Saville won the title after defeating JC Aragone and Alex Lawson 6–4, 4–6, [10–5] in the final.

Seeds

Draw

References

External links
 Main draw

Levene Gouldin & Thompson Tennis Challenger - Doubles
2019 Doubles